St. Johns Township may refer to the following places in the United States:

 St. Johns Township, Kandiyohi County, Minnesota
 St. Johns Township, Franklin County, Missouri
 St. Johns Township, Harrison County, Iowa, in Iowa
 St. Johns Township, Hertford County, North Carolina, in North Carolina

See also
 St. John Township (disambiguation)

Township name disambiguation pages